The 1802 United Kingdom general election was the election to the House of Commons of the second Parliament of the United Kingdom. It was the first to be held after the Union of Great Britain and Ireland. The first Parliament had been composed of members of the former Parliaments of the Kingdom of Great Britain and the Kingdom of Ireland.

The Parliament of Great Britain held its last general election in 1796. The final election for the Parliament of Ireland was held in 1797.

The first united Parliament was dissolved on 29 June 1802. The new Parliament was summoned to meet on 31 August 1802, for a maximum seven-year term from that date. (The maximum term could be and normally was curtailed, by the monarch dissolving the Parliament, before its term expired.)

Political situation

Tory Prime Minister Henry Addington led a war-time administration of pro-government Whigs and Tories, collectively referred to as the "Addingtonians", in office during part of the Napoleonic Wars.

The previous Prime Minister, William Pitt the Younger, had been out of office since 1801. King George III had forced Pitt to resign by refusing to agree to Catholic emancipation (allowing Catholics to sit in Parliament) following the Union. His faction in Parliament was generally supportive of the Addington ministry, but was semi-detached from it.

On 25 March 1802 the Treaty of Amiens brought about peace with France, with which Great Britain had been at war since 1792. The international situation remained uneasy and a renewal of war was still possible.

In the election the combination of the followers of Addington and Pitt comfortably defeated the Opposition Whigs of Charles James Fox.

Dates of election
At this period there was not one election day. After receiving a writ (a royal command) for the election to be held, the local returning officer fixed the election timetable for the particular constituency or constituencies he was concerned with. Polling in seats with contested elections could continue for many days.

The election took place over a period of almost two months. The time between the first and last contested elections was 5 July to 28 August 1802.

Summary of the constituencies

Monmouthshire (1 County constituency with 2 MPs and one single member Borough constituency) is included in Wales in these tables. Sources for this period may include the county in England.

Table 1: Constituencies and MPs, by type and country

Table 2: Number of seats per constituency, by type and country

See also
United Kingdom general elections
Members of the 2nd UK Parliament from Ireland
1803 Gatton by-election

Notes

References
 British Electoral Facts 1832–1999, compiled and edited by Colin Rallings and Michael Thrasher (Ashgate Publishing Ltd 2000). Source: Dates of Elections – Footnote to Table 5.02
 British Historical Facts 1760–1830, by Chris Cook and John Stevenson (The Macmillan Press 1980). Source: Types of constituencies – Great Britain
 His Majesty's Opposition 1714–1830, by Archibald S. Foord (Oxford University Press 1964)
 Parliamentary Election Results in Ireland 1801–1922, edited by B.M. Walker (Royal Irish Academy 1978). Source: Types of constituencies – Ireland

1802 elections in the United Kingdom
General election
1802
July 1802 events
August 1802 events
1800s elections in Ireland